Whanganui Airport (named Wanganui Airport until 2016) is the airport that serves Whanganui, New Zealand . It is located to the south of Whanganui River, approximately 4 km from the centre of Whanganui. The airport has a single asphalt runway and 4 grass runways.The airport has a single terminal with just two gates.

History
The airport was opened in 1954, and services to the airport began in November that year. In September 2013, Air New Zealand announced that it would withdraw services from Whanganui to Wellington and Taupo in December 2013. Sounds Air briefly took over the Wellington route, however this was later terminated on 15 May 2015. Air New Zealand then dropped their Auckland to Whanganui service on 31 July 2016. Air Chathams now operates to Whanganui from Auckland. Air Whanganui is based at the airport which offer charter and medivac flights. 
The Mayor of Whanganui Annette Main says that with the commitment of Air Chathams it saved the airport from closure.

Airlines and destinations

See also

 List of airports in New Zealand
 List of airlines of New Zealand
 Transport in New Zealand

References

External links
 Whanganui Airport website

Airports in New Zealand
Buildings and structures in Whanganui
Transport in Manawatū-Whanganui
Whanganui
Transport buildings and structures in Manawatū-Whanganui